Željava Air Base, situated on the border between Croatia and Bosnia and Herzegovina under the  mountain, near the city of Bihać, was the largest underground airport and military air base in the Socialist Federal Republic of Yugoslavia (SFRY), and one of the largest in Europe. The facilities are shared by the local governments of Bihać and Lika-Senj County of Croatia.

History

The "Objekat" series of military installations can be found in secluded but strategically important areas within the former Yugoslavia, and the construction of these military bases were initialized by the SFRY's defence ministry.

During the Yugoslav Wars, most of these bases were used by the Serbs in certain operations, but due to extenuating circumstances imposed by the Croat forces, they were destroyed and later rendered useless for military use.

Nowadays, they are popular for urban exploration, although it is risky due to the possibility of anti-personnel landmines being located in unexplored areas. However, some were spared the destruction due to other circumstances where the Serbs did not control these installations. An example of some that are still in use is the D-0 Armijska Ratna Komanda nuclear bunker in Konjic, however the latter was turned into an art complex, but is still owned by the Ministry of Defence of Bosnia and Herzegovina.

The construction of the Željava or Bihać Air Base (code named "Objekat 505") was inspired by mountain hangars used by the Swedish Göta Wing (F 9), began in 1948 and was completed in 1968. During those two decades, SFRY spent approximately $6 billion on its construction, three times the combined current annual military budgets of Serbia and Croatia. It was one of the largest and most expensive military construction projects in Europe.

The airfield was documented by American CORONA satellite reconnaissance in 1968.

Description

The role of the facility was to establish, integrate and coordinate a nationwide early warning radar network in SFRY akin to NORAD in the US. The complex was designed and built to sustain a direct hit from a 20-kiloton nuclear bomb, equivalent to that dropped on Nagasaki.

Strategic role

The main advantage of the base was the strategic location of its "Celopek" intercept and surveillance radar on Mount , at the nerve center of an advanced integrated air defence network covering the airspace and territory of Yugoslavia, and possibly further. In addition to its main roles as a protected radar installation, control centre, and secure communications facility, the airbase contained tunnels housing two full fighter squadrons, one reconnaissance squadron, and associated maintenance facilities. The units based there were the 124.LAE (Fighter Aviation Squadron) and 125.LAE, both equipped with MiG-21bis fighter aircraft, and the 352.IAE (Reconnaissance Aviation Squadron), equipped with MiG-21R reconnaissance-fighter aircraft.

Eventually, it was hoped that the base would be re-equipped with the indigenously developed Yu Supersonik aircraft.

Underground "KLEK" complex

The underground facility was lined with semicircular concrete shields, arranged every , to cushion the impact of incoming munitions. The complex included an underground water source, power generators, crew quarters, and other strategic military facilities. It also housed a mess hall that could feed 1,000 people simultaneously, along with stores of food, fuel and arms sufficient to last 30 days. Fuel was supplied by a  underground pipe network connected to a military warehouse on Pokoj Hill near Bihać.

Surface

Above ground, the facility had five runways and within the immediate vicinity of the base, there were numerous short-range mobile tracking and targeting radars; surface-to-air missile sites equipped with; 2K12 "Kub" (NATO: SA-6) mobile surface-to-air missile interceptor systems, motorized infantry bases, two Quick Reaction Alert aircraft ready for take off at any moment, military police stations, and a hunting lodge used by civilian and military leaders on occasional leisure trips.

Access points were heavily monitored and guards were authorized to fire upon anyone attempting to enter without authorization. However, in practice only special permits were required and unauthorized visitors usually turned away.

Destruction

The airbase was used intensively in 1991, during the Yugoslav Wars. During its withdrawal, the Yugoslav People's Army destroyed the runway by filling pre-built spaces (designed for the purpose) with explosives and detonating them. To prevent any possible further use of the complex by Croatian and Bosnia-Herzegovinan forces, the Military of Serbian Krajina completed the destruction in 1992 by setting off an additional 56 tonnes of explosives. The ensuing explosion was so powerful that it shook the nearby city of Bihać. Residents of nearby villages claimed that smoke continued to rise from the tunnels for six months after the explosion.

Current status

Local police forces and the CPA currently use the area to train canines with actual land mines, given the extensive number of mines still in the vicinity. Because of the mines, extreme caution must be used when visiting the Željava complex. In November 2000, a Bosnian Air Force major died after setting off a PROM-2 anti-personnel mine while searching for mushrooms.

The toll of the destruction on base buildings and equipment is incalculable and caused great environmental damage. Potential reconstruction endeavors are limited by a lack of financial resources. An international border bisects the base area, and the entire area is heavily mined. The barracks in the nearby village of Ličko Petrovo Selo are operated by the Croatian Army.

Today, the base is a common waypoint for illegal migrants. A facility for asylum seekers was scheduled to open there in 2004 or 2005, but the idea was abandoned, and new plans were developed for it to become part of the Slunj military training grounds, and barracks from the nearby Udbina complex. However, this idea was dropped in line with the agreement between the countries of former Yugoslavia which bans any military facility up to  inside the borders.

The Bihać Municipality launched an initiative to open a local airport using the runway.

See also
Armijska Ratna Komanda D-0
Slatina Air Base
Yugoslav Air Force

References

External links

Željava runways layout & numbering scheme

Yugoslav Air Force bases
Buildings and structures in Bihać
Airports in Bosnia and Herzegovina
Defunct airports
Airports in Croatia
History of Lika
Buildings and structures demolished in 1992
Aircraft underground hangars in Europe
Nuclear bunkers in Bosnia and Herzegovina
Subterranean structures in Bosnia and Herzegovina
Airports disestablished in 1992
History of Bihać